was a Japanese actor and voice actor. He was born in Kōchi Prefecture. He usually played villains and performed the voices for many anime characters and tokusatsu villains. He is most famous for voicing Kaminari in Doraemon. He took over the ongoing roles of Shingo Kanemoto after his death.  Other major roles included Inspector Takao Arizuka in the You're Under Arrest franchise, Naoyuki Kamikurata in Aquarian Age: Sign for Evolution, Colonel John Kowen in Mobile Suit Gundam 0083: Stardust Memory, and Director Yachio Tokugawa in Strawberry Eggs. He also wrote an instructional book about voice acting, Seiyū Naritai. Watabe was being treated for lung cancer when he died of pneumonia at the age of 74.

Filmography

Anime

Film

|  || 21 Emon: Uchū Ike! Hadashi no Princess21エモン 宇宙いけ！ 裸足のプリンセス || Gargano || || 
|-

Tokusatsu

He was sometimes paired up with Kaoru Shinoda.
 Barom-1- Ikadorge
 Inazuman- Sunabanbara, Aburabanbara
 Akumaizer 3- Aonirda
 Ninja Captor- Mirror Ascetic
 Kaiketsu Zubat- Sentodevil (Actor : Kai Atou)
 Pro-Wres no Hoshi Aztecaser- Killer Kumazawa (Actor : Don Arakawa)
 Red Tiger- Commander Super, Commander Geller, Commander Marche
 Space Sheriff Sharivan - Guardian of the Iga Crystal
 Space Sheriff Shaider (Movie) - Meteor Gunman Omega
 Choujinki Metalder- God Neros, Furious Fighter Jamune, Explosive Fighter Damnen
 Kamen Rider Black- Creation King, Doram (movies, substituting for Shōzō Iizuka)
 Sekai Ninja Sen Jiraiya- Akunobo Sugitani 
 Juukou B-Fighter -  Gaohm

Video games

Overseas dubbing

Live-action

 Airport '77 (1987 TV Asahi edition) -
 Alien (1981 Laserdisc edition) - Parker (Yaphet Kotto)
 Anaconda - Paul Serone (Jon Voight)
 Any Given Sunday (2002 NTV edition) - Monroe (Jim Brown)
 Back to the Future (1990 Fuji TV edition) - Marvin Berry (Harry Waters Jr.)
 Ben-Hur (1990 NTV edition) - Quintus Arrius (Jack Hawkins)
 Bend of the River (1972 Fuji TV edition) - Red (Jack Lambert)
 Bird on a Wire (1993 TV Asahi edition) - Albert "Diggs" Diggins (Bill Duke)
 Breakdown - Warren"Red" Barr (J. T. Walsh)  
 Casino Royale (1972 NTV edition) - Smernov (Kurt Kasznar)
 Casper: A Spirited Beginning - Kibosh (James Earl Jones)
 Caravan of Courage: An Ewok Adventure - Chukha-Trok
 Commando (1987 TBS edition) - Cooke (Bill Duke)
 The Empire Strikes Back (1980 Movie theater edition) - Rebel Derek “Hobbie” Klivian (Richard Oldfield)
 The Dark Crystal (Blu-Ray edition) - skekZok (Jerry Nelson)
 Dawn of the Dead (1982 TV Tokyo edition) - Dr. Millard Rausch (Richard France)
 Deliverance (1979 TV Asahi edition) - Mountain Man (Bill McKinney) 
 The Elephant Man (1982 TBS edition) - Jim (Michael Elphick)
 The Exterminator (1981 Fuji TV edition) - Gino Pontivini (Dick Boccelli)
 Exit Wounds (DVD edition) - Frank Daniels (Bruce McGill)
 Force 10 from Navarone (1986 TV Asahi edition) -  Captain Dražak (Richard Kiel)
 The Four Feathers (2006 TV Tokyo edition) - Colonel Sutch (James Cosmo)
 The French Connection (1974 Fuji TV edition) - Pierre Nicoli (Marcel Bozzuffi)
 The Getaway (1982 TV Asahi edition) - The Accountant (John Bryson)
 Glory (1994 NTV edition) - Sergeant Major John Rawlins (Morgan Freeman)
 Gunfight at the O.K. Corral (1977 NTV and 1985 TV Asahi editions) - Ike Clanton (Lyle Bettger)
 The Great Escape (1971 Fuji TV edition) - Haynes "Diversions" (Lawrence Montaigne)
 To Kill a Mockingbird (1972 NET edition) - Tom Robinson (Brock Peters)
 Kiss of the Dragon (2003 TV Tokyo edition) - Lupo (Max Ryan)
 Independence Day (1999 TV Asahi edition) - Marty Gilbert (Harvey Fierstein)
 Mad Max 2 (1984 Fuji TV edition) - Wez (Vernon Wells) 
 Major Dundee (1972 TBS edition) - Samuel Potts (James Coburn) 
 Midnight Run (VHS edition) - Alonzo Mosely (Yaphet Kotto)
   Midnight Run (1992 TV Asahi edition) - Tony (Richard Foronjy)
 Midway (1983 TV Asahi edition) - Captain Vinton Maddox (James Coburn)
 Miracles - Fei (Lo Lieh)
 Papillon (1979 Fuji TV edition) - Julot (Don Gordon) 
 Play Dirty (1973 NET edition) - Boudesh (Scott Miller) 
 Predator (1989 Fuji TV edition) - Major General Homer Philips (R.G. Armstrong) 
 Psycho (1983 TBS edition) - Milton Arbogast (Martin Balsam) 
 Rainbow Drive (1992 TV Tokyo edition) - Hans Roehrig (James Laurenson) 
 Soylent Green (1978 Fuji TV edition) - Chief Hatcher (Brock Peters)
 Stuart Little - Officer Sherman (Jon Polito)
 A Thousand Acres - Harold Clark (Pat Hingle)

Animation
 Aladdin
 Animaniacs (Thaddeus Plotz)
 The Aristocats (French Milkman)
 Beauty and the Beast (Monsieur D'Arque)
 The Black Cauldron
 Dinosaur (Yar)
 DuckTales (El Capitan)
 The Jungle Book (ElephantG)
 The Jungle Book II (ElephantG)
 The Land Before Time  Narrator 
 The Land Before Time VIII: The Big Freeze (Narrator)
 The Land Before Time IX: Journey to Big Water (Narrator)
 Hercules
 Mulan (Ghost Human)
 Mulan II (Ghost Human)
 Robin Hood (King Richard)
 Tarzan (Tweelson)
 Tarzan 2 (Tweelson)
 Tarzan and Jane (Tweelson)
 Titan A.E. (Tek)

Successors
 Katsumi Cho, Masanori Machida: Nintama Rantaro: Tsukaguchi Mizudo
 Hiroshi Naka: Naruto: Gamabunta
 Kenyuu Horiyuchi: Kaasan – Mom's Life: Grandpa
 Seizō Katō, Kyousei Tsuui: The Good Wife: (Jonas Stern Kevin Conway)
 Shozo Iizuka: Space Sheriff Gavan: The Movie: Genesis King, Kamen Rider: Battride War

References

External links
 Official agency profile 
 Takeshi Watabe at GamePlaza Haruka Voice Acting Database 
 
 
 

1936 births
2010 deaths
Deaths from pneumonia in Japan
Japanese male video game actors
Japanese male voice actors
Male voice actors from Kōchi Prefecture
Tokyo Actor's Consumer's Cooperative Society voice actors
81 Produce voice actors